Judicial review is a process under which executive, legislative and administrative actions are subject to review by the judiciary. A court with authority for judicial review may invalidate laws, acts and governmental actions that are incompatible with a higher authority: an executive decision may be invalidated for being unlawful or a statute may be invalidated for violating the terms of a constitution. Judicial review is one of the checks and balances in the separation of powers: the power of the judiciary to supervise the legislative and executive branches when the latter exceed their authority. The doctrine varies between jurisdictions, so the procedure and scope of judicial review may differ between and within countries.

General principles 

Judicial review can be understood in the context of two distinct—but parallel—legal systems, civil law and common law, and also by two distinct theories of democracy regarding the manner in which government should be organized with respect to the principles and doctrines of legislative supremacy and the separation of powers.

First, two distinct legal systems, civil law and common law, have different views about judicial review. Common-law judges are seen as sources of law, capable of creating new legal principles, and also capable of rejecting legal principles that are no longer valid. In the civil-law tradition, judges are seen as those who apply the law, with no power to create (or destroy) legal principles.

Secondly, the idea of separation of powers is another theory about how a democratic society's government should be organized. In contrast to legislative supremacy, the idea of separation of powers was first introduced by Montesquieu; it was later institutionalized in the United States by the Supreme Court's ruling in Marbury v. Madison that the court had the power of judicial review to enforce the separation of powers stated in the US Constitution. This was left uncontested by the U.S. Congress and president Thomas Jefferson, despite his expressed opposition to the principle of judicial review by an unelected body.

Separation of powers is based on the idea that no branch of government should be able to exert power over any other branch without due process of law; each branch of government should have a check on the powers of the other branches of government, thus creating a regulative balance among all branches of government. The key to this idea is checks and balances. In the United States, judicial review is considered a key check on the powers of the other two branches of government by the judiciary.

Differences in organizing democratic societies led to different views regarding judicial review, with societies based on common law and those stressing a separation of powers being the most likely to utilize judicial review. Nevertheless, many countries whose legal systems are based on the idea of legislative supremacy have gradually adopted or expanded the scope of judicial review, including countries from both the civil law and common law traditions.

Another reason why judicial review should be understood in the context of both the development of two distinct legal systems (civil law and common law) and two theories of democracy (legislative supremacy and separation of powers) is that some countries with common-law systems do not have judicial review of primary legislation. Though a common-law system is present in the United Kingdom, the country still has a strong attachment to the idea of legislative supremacy; consequently, judges in the United Kingdom do not have the power to strike down primary legislation. However, when the United Kingdom became a member of the European Union there was tension between its tendency toward legislative supremacy and the EU's legal system, which specifically gives the Court of Justice of the European Union the power of judicial review.

Principles of review 

When carrying out judicial review a court may ensure that the principle of ultra vires are followed, that a public body's actions do not exceed the powers given to them by legislation.

The decisions of administrative acts by public bodies under judicial review are not necessarily controlled in the same way that judicial decisions are, rather a court will enforce that principles of procedural fairness are followed when making judicial decisions.

Types

Review of administrative acts and secondary legislation 

Most modern legal systems allow the courts to review administrative "acts" (individual decisions of a public body, such as a decision to grant a subsidy or to withdraw a residence permit). In most systems, this also includes review of secondary legislation (legally enforceable rules of general applicability adopted by administrative bodies). Some countries (notably France and Germany) have implemented a system of administrative courts which are charged with resolving disputes between members of the public and the administration, regardless these courts are part of administration (France) or judiciary (Germany). In other countries (including the United States and United Kingdom), judicial review is carried out by regular civil courts although it may be delegated to specialized panels within these courts (such as the Administrative Court within the High Court of England and Wales). The United States employs a mixed system in which some administrative decisions are reviewed by the United States district courts (which are the general trial courts), some are reviewed directly by the United States courts of appeals and others are reviewed by specialized tribunals such as the United States Court of Appeals for Veterans Claims (which, despite its name, is not technically part of the federal judicial branch). It is quite common that before a request for judicial review of an administrative act is filed with a court, certain preliminary conditions (such as a complaint to the authority itself) must be fulfilled. In most countries, the courts apply special procedures in administrative cases.

Review of primary legislation 

There are three broad approaches to judicial review of the constitutionality of primary legislation—that is, laws passed  directly by an elected legislature.

No review by any courts 

Some countries do not permit a review of the validity of primary legislation. In the United Kingdom, Acts of Parliament cannot be set aside under the doctrine of parliamentary sovereignty, whereas Orders in Council, another type of primary legislation not passed by Parliament, can (see Council of Civil Service Unions v Minister for the Civil Service (1985) and Miller/Cherry (2019)). Another example is the Netherlands, where the constitution expressly forbids the courts to rule on the question of constitutionality of primary legislation passed by the Dutch legislature or States-General.

Review by general courts 

In countries which have inherited the English common law system of courts of general jurisdiction, judicial review is generally done by those courts, rather than specialised courts. Australia, Canada and the United States are all examples of this approach.

In the United States, federal and state courts (at all levels, both appellate and trial) are able to review and declare the "constitutionality", or agreement with the Constitution (or lack thereof) of legislation by a process of judicial interpretation that is relevant to any case properly within their jurisdiction. In American legal language, "judicial review" refers primarily to the adjudication of the constitutionality of statutes, especially by the Supreme Court of the United States. Courts in the United States may also invoke judicial review in order to ensure that a statute is not depriving individuals of their constitutional rights. This is commonly held to have been established in the case of Marbury v. Madison, which was argued before the Supreme Court in 1803.

Judicial review in Canada and Australia pre-dates their establishment as countries, in 1867 and 1901, respectively. The British Colonial Laws Validity Act 1865 provided that a British colony could not enact laws which altered provisions of British laws which applied directly to the colony. Since the constitutions of Canada and Australia were enacted by the British Parliament, laws passed by governments in Australia and Canada had to be consistent with those constitutional provisions. More recently, the principle of judicial review flows from supremacy clauses in their constitutions. In Australia, the term 'judicial review' generally refers to reviews of the lawfulness of the actions of the executive and the public service, while reviews of the compatibility of laws with the Australian Constitution is known as characterisation or constitutional challenges.

Review by a specialized court 

In 1920, Czechoslovakia adopted a system of judicial review by a specialized court, the Constitutional Court as written by Hans Kelsen, a leading jurist of the time. This system was also adopted the same time by Austria and became known as the Austrian System, also under the primary authorship of Hans Kelsen, being emulated by a number of other countries. In these systems, other courts are not competent to question the constitutionality of primary legislation; they often may, however, initiate the process of review by the Constitutional Court.

Russia adopts a mixed model since (as in the US) courts at all levels, both federal and state, are empowered to review primary legislation and declare its constitutionality; as in the Czech Republic, there is a constitutional court in charge of reviewing the constitutionality of primary legislation. The difference is that in the first case, the decision about the law's adequacy to the Russian Constitution only binds the parties to the lawsuit; in the second, the Court's decision must be followed by judges and government officials at all levels.

By country 

The below table compares the approach of different countries to constitutional review or judicial review as of 2010.

In specific jurisdictions 

 
 Judicial review in Austria
 Judicial review in Bangladesh
 Judicial review in Canada
 Constitutional Court of the Czech Republic
 Judicial review in Denmark
 Judicial review in English law
 Judicial review in Germany
 Judicial review in Hong Kong
 Judicial review in India
 Judicial review in Ireland
 Judicial review in Malaysia
 Judicial review in New Zealand
 Judicial review in the Philippines
 Judicial review in Scotland
 Judicial review in South Africa
 Judicial review in South Korea
 Judicial review in Sweden
 Judicial review in Switzerland
 Judicial Yuan (Taiwan / Republic of China)
 Judicial review in the United States

See also 

 Judicial Appeal
 Judicial activism
 Living Constitution
 Originalism
 Unconstitutional constitutional amendment

References

Further reading 

 Edward S. Corwin, The Doctrine of Judicial Review: Its Legal and Historical Basis and Other Essays. Piscataway, New Jersey: Transaction Publishers, 2014.
 R. L. Maddex, Constitutions of the World, Washington, D.C.: CQ Press, 2008, .

External links 

 Judicial Review: A Legal Guide
  (Country by country case studies)
  (A comparison of modern constitutions)
  (A comparison of national judicial review doctrines)
  (This book traces the doctrine's history in an international/comparative fashion)
  (The effects of politics in law in Germany)
 Galera, S. (ed.), Judicial Review. A Comparative Analysis inside the European Legal System, Council of Europe, 2010,